Cora barbifera is a species of basidiolichen in the family Hygrophoraceae. It was formally described as a new species in 2016 by Bibiana Moncada, Ayda Lucía Patiño, and Robert Lücking. The specific epithet barbifera refers to the dense setae on the thallus surface, which somewhat resembles a beard. The lichen is known to occur only at the type locality in the páramo of Cerro Negro, Colombia, where it grows as an epiphyte on paramo shrubs. Cora hirsuta and C. schizophylloides are closely related species.

References

barbifera
Lichen species
Lichens described in 2016
Lichens of Colombia
Taxa named by Robert Lücking
Basidiolichens